Cecília Wohl (aka Cecil Wohl; 1862, Vilnius – 5 September 1939, Budapest district 1) was a Lithuanian-Viennese master, Budapestian salonist known as "Cecil mama", a daughter of the senior teacher of Jewish history at the Vilna rabbinic seminary Osher Leyzerovich Vol, and the mother of Karl Polanyi and Michael Polanyi.

References 

 http://www.mek.iif.hu/porta/szint/egyeb/lexikon/eletrajz/html/ABC11587/12321.htm
 http://www.kfki.hu/chemonet/polanyi/9702/szapor.html
 https://web.archive.org/web/20121001061114/http://homepage3.nifty.com/thinkers/plnykcv.htm (Japanese)

Cecilia
Jews from the Russian Empire
Jewish philanthropists
Hungarian philanthropists
Austro-Hungarian Jews
Emigrants from the Russian Empire to Austria-Hungary
People from Vilnius
1862 births
1939 deaths